Mohamed Bouyahiaoui Hospital was founded in 1978 in the town of Boumerdès and is the oldest hospital in this city.

This hospital center is affiliated with the Algerian Ministry of Health, Population and Hospital Reform.

Services
The hospital provides the following services:
 Dermatology
 Emergency department
 Emergency medicine
 Family medicine
 Gynaecology
 Occupational medicine
 Pediatrics

Location

See also
 Ministry of Health, Population and Hospital Reform
 Health in Algeria

References

Hospitals in Algeria
Boumerdès
Kabylie
Hospitals established in 1978
1978 establishments in Algeria